Radderahatti is a small village/hamlet in Athani Taluk in Belagavi District of Karnataka, India. It comes under Radderahatti Grama Panchayath with 13 members. It belongs to Belgaum Division. The local language is Kannada and the population is 5700 with 1138 houses. The female population is 49.3%, the overall literacy rate is 72.4% and the female literacy rate is 61.3%. Basaveshwara temple, Girimalleshwar Math, and Durgadevi temple are some spiritual and religious places.

References

Villages in Belagavi district